Jo Farb Hernández is a folklorist, curator, and award-winning writer based in Watsonville, California and Catalunya, Spain. Succeeding founder Seymour Rosen as the second Executive Director of Saving and Preserving Arts and Cultural Environments (or SPACES Archives), she helped develop the most extensive public archive on the subject of art environments in the world, and is recognized globally as one of the experts in the field.

Career 
Hernández has worked for over 45 years in the art world, and is currently Director Emerita of the Natalie and James Thompson Art Gallery and Professor Emerita in the Department of Art and Art History at San Jose State University. She earlier served as Director and Chief Curator of the Triton Museum of Art (Santa Clara, California, 1978-1985) and the Monterey Museum of Art (1985-1993). Hernández is internationally recognized as one of the foremost scholars in the field of art environments, and has received the distinguished Chicago Folklore Prize from the American Folklore Society for her writing on the subject. Other awards include a Fulbright Senior Scholar Research Award (2008), and being named as the 2014 President's Scholar at SJSU. Her book, Singular Spaces: From the Eccentric to the Extraordinary in Spanish Art Environments (2013), has been described as the “most impressive single volume ever published in the field of self-taught art.” She is a contributing editor for Raw Vision magazine (UK), serves on the International Editorial Board for Elsewhere – the International Journal of Self-Taught and Outsider Art (Australia) and on the Advisory Council for Bric-a-Brac Arte Outsider journal (Italy), and is a member of several national and international boards for nonprofit arts organizations and art environments.

Hernández has published 50 books and exhibition catalogs, as well as almost 100 articles in journals and encyclopedias in four countries. She has curated 237 exhibitions in the United States, Japan, Switzerland, and Spain, and has received over 30 honors and awards, including a Fulbright Senior Scholar in Residence Award to undertake extended research in Spain for Singular Spaces. She has been on juries for national, statewide, and regional exhibitions; and a panelist for the California Arts Council and the U.S. Information Agency.

Among Hernández's other book-length works are A. G. Rizzoli: Architect of Magnificent Visions (Harry N. Abrams, 1997) and Forms of Tradition in Contemporary Spain, the latter published in 2005. In addition, as part of her curatorial work, Hernandez has authored exhibition catalogue texts on the works of Lorser Feitelson, Shoji Hamada, Jeremy Anderson, August François Gay, and Misch Kohn, among others.

Coauthored with John Beardsley and Roger Cardinal, A. G. Rizzoli depicts the life and work of San Francisco draftsman and artist Achilles G. (A. G.) Rizzoli (1896-1981). Publishers Weekly described the book as full of "perceptive essays offer a tantalizing introduction to Rizzoli's extraordinary visions."

Service 

Hernández's expertise has been consulted on the preservation of a number of art environment sites, including Leonard Knight's Salvation Mountain, as well as a number of sites in Spain, often providing strategic advocacy to sustain, support, or save a site. She has been particularly active in saving the Spanish art environments of Josep Pujiula in Argelaguer, as well as those of Francisco González Gragera, Blas García, and Julio Basanta.

Hernández served as President of the California Association of Museums from 1991-1992, and has served the Association in different capacities between 1985 and 1994.

References

American folklorists
American art curators
American women curators
Year of birth missing (living people)
Living people
Women folklorists
21st-century American women